Ignite is the eighth studio album by Shihad and was released on 20 September 2010 in New Zealand and 24 September 2010 in Australia. Ignite debuted at number one on the New Zealand Music Chart, eventually achieving gold sales there.

Lead single "Sleepeater" is featured in Konami's Pro Evolution Soccer 2011 video game.

Critical reception
Scott Kara from The New Zealand Herald gave Ignite four out of five stars, praising Shihad's heavy and potent music. The Dominion Post Lindsay Davis lauded its "raw, dirtier sound" rating the album three-and-a-half out of five stars. Nick Ward of The Nelson Mail gave it four out of five stars, commending the maturity and versatility of the band.

Commercial performance
Ignite debuted on the New Zealand Albums Chart at number one on 27 September 2010, which made Shihad the first New Zealand band to have four albums debut at number one. The album also appeared on the Australian Albums Chart at number forty-four on 10 October 2010.

Track listing

Certifications

References

2010 albums
Shihad albums
Roadrunner Records albums